Gogu is a given name. Notable people with this name include:

 Gogu Constantinescu (1881–1965), Romanian scientist, engineer and inventor
 Gogu Neagoe, Romanian cartoonist
 Gogu Rădulescu (1914–1991), Romanian communist politician and economist
 Gogu Shyamala (born 1969), Indian writer
 Gogu Tonca (1947–2010), Romanian football player

Romanian masculine given names